Captain Ernest Edgar Davies  (18 March 1890 – 23 January 1962) was an Australian First World War flying ace credited with seven aerial victories.

Early life and background
Davies was born in Kerang, Victoria, the son of John Herbert Davies. He graduated Master of Laws from University of Melbourne, and was admitted as a solicitor of the state in June 1914.

World War I
In November 1915 Davies enlisted into the 4th Light Horse Regiment at Seymour. He later transferred to the Australian Flying Corps and after flight training at RAAF Laverton, was commissioned as a lieutenant in May 1917. Davies sailed for England in June 1917, and was appointed a flying officer in the British Royal Flying Corps in December. He served with No. 2 Squadron AFC in France from early 1918.

Flying a S.E.5a single-seat fighter Davies accounted for seven enemy aircraft between 27 August and 4 November, sharing two with Captain Eric Douglas Cummings. On 3 June 1919 he was awarded the Distinguished Flying Cross "in recognition of distinguished services rendered during the war".

List of aerial victories

Post-war life
Davies returned to Australia in late 1919 and returned to his legal practice, initially based at Swan Hill, and then from Bank Place, Melbourne from the 1930s. He continued to fly, but suffered the embarrassment of being fined £50 in August 1932 for flying after having allowed his aircraft registration and flying licence to expire.

On 23 January 1962 fishing equipment was found on the banks of the Mitchell River at Bairnsdale. After a search the bodies of Davies and his secretary Mrs. Grace Stewart were discovered in the river. It was assumed that both drowned after one fell into the water and the other attempted a rescue.

References

External links
 

1890 births
1962 deaths
People from Kerang
Melbourne Law School alumni
Australian Army soldiers
Australian Flying Corps officers
Australian World War I flying aces
Australian recipients of the Distinguished Flying Cross (United Kingdom)
Deaths by drowning in Australia